Amanda Laird (born 12 August 1978) is an Australian former synchronized swimmer who competed in the 2000 Summer Olympics and in the 2004 Summer Olympics.

References

External links
 
 
 

1978 births
Living people
Australian synchronised swimmers
Olympic synchronised swimmers of Australia
Synchronized swimmers at the 2000 Summer Olympics
Synchronized swimmers at the 2004 Summer Olympics